The 1953 Sunderland South by-election was held on 13 May 1953.  It was held due to the death of the Labour MP Richard Ewart.  It was gained by the Conservative candidate Paul Williams who had unsuccessfully contested the seat in the 1951 general election.  It was the first time since 1924 that an incumbent government had gained a seat from the opposition in a by-election.  The gain was held at the 1955 general election.

References

By-elections to the Parliament of the United Kingdom in County Durham constituencies
Politics of the City of Sunderland
1953 in England
1953 elections in the United Kingdom
20th century in County Durham